Jarosław Bako (born 12 August 1964) is a Polish retired professional footballer who played as a goalkeeper. He serves as an goalkeeping coach for Zagłębie Lubin. Bako was also a member of the Poland national team in the early 1990s and was capped 35 times.

Career statistics

References

External links

 

1964 births
Living people
Sportspeople from Olsztyn
Association football goalkeepers
Polish footballers
Poland youth international footballers
Poland international footballers
ŁKS Łódź players
Zagłębie Lubin players
Legia Warsaw players
Beşiktaş J.K. footballers
Hapoel Tel Aviv F.C. players
Hapoel Jerusalem F.C. players
Jeziorak Iława players
Lech Poznań players
Ekstraklasa players
Süper Lig players
Association football goalkeeping coaches
Polish expatriate footballers
Expatriate footballers in Israel
Polish expatriate sportspeople in Israel
Expatriate footballers in Turkey
Polish expatriate sportspeople in Turkey